Winsome Cripps (later Dennis, 9 February 1931 – 30 May 1997) was an Australian sprinter who competed at the 1952 Summer Olympics and the 1954 British Empire and Commonwealth Games.

In 1952, Cripps competed in the Australian National Championships, and finished third in the 100 yard race and second place in the 220 yards and so was picked for the Australian Athletics Olympic team.

At the 1952 Summer Olympics, Cripps was unlucky to come away without a medal, in the 100 metres she won her first round heat in 12 seconds, then came third in her second round race, luckily the first three from each heat qualified for the semi-finals, in her semi-final she again ran in a time of 12 seconds and finished behind fellow Australian, Marjorie Jackson who ran an equalling World Record time of 11.5 seconds, in the final she ran her best time of 11.9 seconds but only managed to finish in fourth place. A couple of days later she competed in the 200 metres, in her first round heat she finished second and qualified for the next round where again she finished second, and in the final she yet again finished in fourth place. Cripps last event was the 4 x 100 metres relay and with her team mates Marjorie Jackson, Verna Johnston and Shirley Strickland they broke the World Record in their heat running a time off 46.1 seconds, in the final they were ahead until when Cripps (on the third leg) passed the baton to Jackson, somehow Cripps knee hit the baton in Jackson's hand and it fell to the floor, even though it bounced up and Jackson caught it time had been lost and they ended up finishing fifth and to make things worse the United States quartet broke the World Record.

Two years later she competed in the 1954 British Empire and Commonwealth Games, this time she returned home with silver medals in the 100 yards and the 220 yard races and with Gwen Wallace, Marjorie Jackson-Nelson and Nancy Fogarty she won gold in the 4 x 110 yards relay.

Cripps retired from athletics shortly after failing to be picked for the 1956 Summer Olympics.

References

1931 births
1997 deaths
Australian female sprinters
Olympic athletes of Australia
Athletes (track and field) at the 1952 Summer Olympics
Olympic gold medalists for Australia
Athletes (track and field) at the 1954 British Empire and Commonwealth Games
Commonwealth Games gold medallists for Australia
Commonwealth Games medallists in athletics
Medalists at the 1952 Summer Olympics
Olympic gold medalists in athletics (track and field)
Olympic female sprinters
Medallists at the 1954 British Empire and Commonwealth Games